The political system of Qatar is a semi-constitutional monarchy with the emir as head of state and chief executive, and the prime minister as the head of government. Under the Constitution of Qatar, the partially-elected Consultative Assembly has a limited ability to reject legislation and dismiss ministers. The first general election was held in 2021.

The hereditary emir of Qatar (currently, Tamim bin Hamad al-Thani) holds nearly all executive and legislative authority, as well as controlling the judiciary. He appoints the prime minister and cabinet. According to Freedom House, political rights are limited.

Legal system
Sharia law is a main source of Qatari legislation according to Qatar's constitution. Sharia law is applied to laws pertaining to family law, inheritance, and several criminal acts (including adultery, robbery and murder). In some cases in Sharia-based family courts, a female's testimony is worth half a man's and in some cases a female witness is not accepted at all. Codified family law was introduced in 2006. In practice, Qatar's legal system is a mixture of civil law and Islamic law.

Flogging is used in Qatar as a punishment for alcohol consumption or illicit sexual relations. Article 88 of Qatar's criminal code declares the punishment for adultery is 100 lashes. Adultery is punishable by death when a Muslim woman and a non-Muslim man are involved. In 2006, a Filipino woman was sentenced to 100 lashes for adultery. In 2010, at least 18 people (mostly foreign nationals) were sentenced to flogging of between 40 and 100 lashes for offences related to "illicit sexual relations" or alcohol consumption. In 2011, at least 21 people (mostly foreign nationals) were sentenced to floggings of between 30 and 100 lashes for offences related to "illicit sexual relations" or alcohol consumption. In 2012, six expatriates were sentenced to floggings of either 40 or 100 lashes. Only Muslims considered medically fit were liable to have such sentences carried out. It is unknown if the sentences were implemented. More recently in April 2013, a Muslim expatriate was sentenced to 40 lashes for alcohol consumption. In June 2014, a Muslim expatriate was sentenced to 40 lashes for consuming alcohol and driving under the influence. Judicial corporal punishment is common in Qatar due to the Hanbali interpretation of Sharia Law.

In 2016, Saudi Instagram star and model King Luxy was arrested in Qatar for allegedly being homosexual. He spent 2 months in custody before he was released. Qatari embassy in turn reported that he was arrested before departing from Qatar's only civilian international airport for various charges having nothing to do with his sexual preference and counter-alleged him for intruding on the privacy of a Qatari citizen.

Stoning is a legal punishment in Qatar. Apostasy is a crime punishable by the death penalty in Qatar. Blasphemy is punishable by up to seven years in prison and proselytizing can be punished by up to 10 years in prison. Homosexuality is a crime punishable by the death penalty for Muslims.

Commercial relationships are governed by Qatar's Civil Code.

Qatar's government has been criticized for arresting and threatening anyone who dares to speak out. In the report published by the Euro-Med Human Rights Monitor on 13 September 2020, it was declared that Article 19 in the International Declaration of Human Rights stipulates that "everyone has the right to freedom of opinion and expression; this right includes freedom to hold opinions without interference." Similarly, Article 47 in the Constitution of Qatar stipulates that freedom of expression is guaranteed in accordance with the conditions and circumstances set forth in law.

Alcohol
Alcohol consumption is partially legal in Qatar, some five-star luxury hotels are allowed to sell alcohol to their non-Muslim customers. Muslims are not allowed to consume alcohol in Qatar and Muslims caught consuming alcohol are liable to flogging or deportation. Non-Muslim expatriates can obtain a permit to purchase alcohol for personal consumption. The Qatar Distribution Company (a subsidiary of Qatar Airways) is permitted to import alcohol and pork; it operates the one and only liquor store in the country, which also sells pork to holders of liquor licences. Qatari officials have also indicated a willingness to allow alcohol in "fan zones" at the 2022 FIFA World Cup.

Until recently, restaurants on the Pearl-Qatar (a man-made island near Doha) were allowed to serve alcoholic drinks. In December 2011, however, restaurants on the Pearl were told to stop selling alcohol. No explanation was given for the ban. Speculation about the reason includes the government's desire to project a more pious image in advance of the country's first election of a royal advisory body and rumours of a financial dispute between the government and the resort's developers.

Piety
In 2014, Qatar launched a modesty campaign to remind tourists of the modest dress code. Female tourists are advised not to wear leggings, miniskirts, sleeveless dresses and short or tight clothing in public. Men are advised against wearing only shorts and singlets.

As of 2014, certain provisions of the Qatari Criminal Code allow punishments such as flogging and stoning to be imposed as criminal sanctions. The UN Committee Against Torture found that these practices constituted a breach of the obligations imposed by the UN Convention Against Torture. Qatar retains the death penalty, mainly for threats against national security.

Workers
In February 2022, The African Regional Organization of the International Trade Union Confederation (ITUC-Africa) welcomed the recent announcement by the Qatar government to abolish exit permits for migrant workers. ITUC commended Qatari government for the obvious show of genuine commitment towards meeting their pledge made to the International Labour Organisation (ILO) to effectively reform their labour laws so as to bring in conformity with ILO Conventions and other international statutes.

Cases of ill-treatment of immigrant labour have been observed. The Nepalese ambassador to Qatar, Maya Kumari Sharma, described the emirate as an "open jail".
Qatar does not have national occupational health standards or guidelines, and workplace injuries are the third highest cause of accidental deaths. In May 2012, Qatari officials declared their intention to allow the establishment of an independent trade union. Qatar also announced it will scrap its sponsor system for foreign labour, which requires that all foreign workers be sponsored by local employers, who in some cases hold workers' passports and can deny them permission to change jobs.

In August 2022, 60 Migrant workers were arrested and deported for protesting against the non-payment by their employer, Al Bandary International Group, a major construction and hospitality firm. Some of the demonstrators were from Nepal, Bangladesh, India, Egypt and the Philippines had not been paid for seven months. According to a report published by France 24, those protesters were detained for breaching public security laws and minority of protesters were deported by the order of court who failed to remain peaceful and breached Qatar’s public security law. Qatar’s labour ministry said it will pay Al Bandary workers and will take further action against the company which was already under investigation for failing to pay wages.

Executive branch
Qatar is ruled by the House of Thani as a semi-constitutional hereditary monarchy. The head of state and chief executive is the emir. There is a prime minister (who serves as the head of government) and a cabinet appointed by the emir. Under the Constitution, the partially-elected Consultative Assembly can block legislation with a simple majority vote, and can dismiss ministers with a two-thirds vote. Two-thirds of the members are popularly elected, and the remainder are appointed by the emir.

Politically, Qatar is evolving from a traditional society into a modern welfare state. Government departments have been established to meet the requirements of social and economic progress. The Basic Law of Qatar 1970 institutionalized local customs rooted in Qatar's conservative Islamic heritage, granting the Emir preeminent power. The Emir's role is influenced by continuing traditions of consultation, rule by consensus, and the citizen's right to appeal personally to the Emir. The Emir, while directly accountable to no one, cannot violate the Sharia (Islamic law) and, in practice, must consider the opinions of leading notables and the religious establishment. Their position was institutionalized in the Advisory Council, an appointed body that assists the Emir in formulating policy.

In February 1972, the heir apparent and Prime Minister, Sheikh Khalifa bin Hamad Al Thani, deposed his cousin, Emir Ahmad, and assumed power. This move was supported by the key members of Al Thani and took place without violence or signs of political unrest,

On 27 June 1995, the heir apparent, Sheikh Hamad bin Khalifa Al Thani, deposed his father, Emir Khalifa, in a bloodless coup. Emir Hamad and his father reconciled in 1996. Increased freedom of the press followed, and the Qatar-based Al Jazeera television channel (founded late 1996) is widely regarded as an example of an uncensored source of news in Arab countries. However, the network has been met with negative responses by the governments of many Arab states. However in May 2022, Al Jazeera network won the award for the best human rights journalism of the year in the eighth annual Amnesty Media Awards. The network was also claimed to be non-biased network by The Week (Washington DC media house) in November 2022.

On 25 June 2013 Tamim bin Hamad Al Thani became the Emir of Qatar after his father Hamad bin Khalifa Al Thani handed over power in a televised speech.

|Emir
|Tamim bin Hamad Al Thani
|
|25 June 2013
|-
|Prime Minister
|Mohammed bin Abdulrahman bin Jassim Al Thani
|
|7 March 2023
|}

Ministries
 Ministry of Foreign Affairs
 Ministry of Defense
 Ministry of the Interior
 Ministry of Public Health
 Ministry of Commerce and Industry
 Ministry of Municipality and Environment
 Ministry of Finance
 Ministry of Culture and Sports
 Ministry of Administrative Development, Labor & Social Affairs
 Ministry of Education and Higher Education
 Ministry of Awqaf and Islamic Affairs
Ministry of Transport and Communications
Ministry of Justice
 Amiri Diwan – Sheikh Abdullah bin Khalifa Al Thani

Consultative Assembly
The Consultative Assembly (Majlis ash-Shura) is a 45-member partially-elected legislature made up of 30 elected representatives and 15 appointed by the emir. Elections were repeatedly delayed after the 2003 constitutional referendum introduced this framework. In 2006, Deputy Prime Minister Hamad bin Jassim bin Jaber Al Thani announced that elections would be held in 2007. However, only municipal elections were held. Due to voting laws, those who did not have family in the country pre-1930 were not allowed to vote. This excluded 75% of the population. The first general election was eventually held in October 2021.

Political parties and elections

Qatar held a constitutional referendum in 2003, which was overwhelmingly supported. The first municipal elections with men and women voters and candidates were held in 1999 Central Municipal Council. The first legislative election, for two thirds of the legislative council's 45 seats, were planned for 2016 after previously being postponed in 2013. In June 2016 they were effectively postponed to at least 2019. The first general election of members of the Consultative Assembly was held in 2021.

Suffrage is currently limited to municipal elections and two thirds of the seats in the legislative council, with the voting age set at 18. Expatriate residents are excluded, as are the vast number of residents who are prevented from applying for citizenship. The elected Municipal Council has no executive powers but may offer advice to the Minister.

Political parties are banned by law.

Administrative divisions

There are 8 municipalities (baladiyat , baladiyah ) of Qatar; Ad Dawhah, Al Daayen, Al Khor, Al Wakrah, Al Rayyan, Al-Shahaniya, Al Shamal, and Umm Salal. Each municipality assumes administrative responsibilities over zones (cities and districts) within their boundaries.

Foreign relations

Qatar’s core foreign policy objective according to The Middle East Journal is "state survival" and the "desire for international prestige". Qatar became notable in international politics; and a key figure in the Arab affairs within two decades of its independent foreign policy. It has an "open-door" foreign policy where it maintain ties to all parties and regional players in the region, including with organizations such as Taliban and Hamas.

Its position in the Middle East and close links with terrorist groups is seen as a great asset to western intelligence community and diplomatic relations. Qatar has also cultivated close foreign relationships with Western powers, particularly the United States and the United Kingdom. Al Udeid Air Base hosts American and British air forces.

On October 10, 2005, for the first time, Qatar was elected to a two-year term on the UN Security Council for 2006–2007.

According to BBC, in April 2006 Qatar announced that it will give US$50 million (£28 million) to the new Hamas-led Palestinian government.

In May 2006, Qatar pledged more than $100 million to Hurricane Katrina relief to colleges and universities in Louisiana affected by the hurricane. Some of this money was also distributed to families looking to repair damaged homes by Neighborhood Housing Services of New Orleans, Inc.

With the advent of the Arab Spring in 2011, Qatar has been seen as meddling in the affairs of other Arab countries, supporting insurgents. This policy has led to rebukes by neighboring Gulf states such as Saudi Arabia, Bahrain, and the United Arab Emirates., who also support radical groups and insurgents all over the Middle East. Qatar joined NATO operations in Libya and reportedly armed Libyan opposition groups. It also became a major provider of money and support for rebel groups in the Syrian civil war. With close ties to the Muslim Brotherhood. Some nations have criticized Qatar for supporting rebel organizations in Syria, particularly the al-Nusra Front, an al-Qaeda affiliate there. The Public Policy and Democracy studies research think tank drafted out an article according to which Qatar aligned with the United States against the Assad regime. The country also backed attempts to mediate a conflict-ending political transition in Syria. Furthermore Qatar, Russia, and Turkey began another track of negotiations on Syria’s peace process in March 2021.

The government and royal family of Qatar funds the Al Jazeera television network. The Emir of Qatar Sheikh Hamad bin Khalfia provided a loan of QAR 500 million (USD 137 million) to start the channel. The network has been accused of being biased and taking an active role in the affairs of other countries specifically during the Arab Spring in 2011. Numerous countries have complained about allegedly biased reporting in support of Qatar policy. On 11 January 2015,The Week published a report in which,Al jazeera network was revealed to be non biased and non terrorist network.

Most of the developed countries (plus Brunei and Indonesia) are exempt from visa requirements. Citizens of exempted countries can also request a joint visa that allows them to travel to Oman as well.

Qatar is member of ABEDA, AFESD, AL, AMF, ESCWA, FAO, G-77, GCC, IAEA, IBRD, ICAO, ICRM, IDB, IFAD, IFRCS, IHO (pending member), ILO, IMF, International Maritime Organization, Inmarsat, Intelsat, Interpol, IOC, ISO (correspondent), ITU, NAM, OAPEC, OIC, OPCW, UN, UNCTAD, UNESCO, UNIDO, UPU, WCO, WHO, WIPO, WMO, and WTO.

Qatar may suffer significant geopolitical losses if there is a global transition to renewable energy. It is ranked 152 out of 156 countries in the index of Geopolitical Gains and Losses after energy transition (GeGaLo).

Qatar claims that "since 2017, Qatar feels it has been the victim of a media attack orchestrated by Abu Dhabi, with false documents and fake news." The Qatari Government stated that they were being "exclusively criticised and attacked" by Belgian authorities and conveyed disappointment that the Belgian government "made no effort to engage with our government to establish the facts".

References

External links
Adam Carr's Election Archive

 

bn:কাতার#রাজনীতি